The North Island Credit Union Amphitheatre (formerly known as the Mattress Firm Amphitheatre, Sleep Train Amphitheatre, Coors Amphitheatre and the Cricket Wireless Amphitheatre) is a 20,500-seat amphitheatre located in Chula Vista, California adjacent to Sesame Place San Diego. It is one of the larger concert venues in the San Diego area. The venue is currently owned and operated by Live Nation.

History
Area around the amphitheatre had previously been open fields and at one time been part of a large dairy farm. At one point, the 72 acres where the amphitheater sits was a fully developed industrial park with terraced lots and utilities in place. The site had been abandoned for a number of years when Universal Concerts approached the city of Chula Vista and won approval to build the amphitheatre. The industrial park was bulldozed and the site graded to build the amphitheatre. In the late 1990s, a development plan was created and a water park and concert venue were planned for the area. White Water Canyon (now Sesame Place San Diego) opened in 1997, while Coors Amphitheatre opened July 21, 1998, the first venue of its kind in San Diego County. On August 21, 1998, the venue hosted its first sell-out concert with the English pop girl group Spice Girls.

All of the Universal Concerts facilities, including Coors Amphitheatre, were purchased by House of Blues in late 1999. Live Nation Entertainment purchased House of Blues, including 8 amphitheaters and eleven clubs, in July 2006. In April 2008, the venue was renamed Cricket Wireless Amphitheatre after naming rights were purchased by Cricket Wireless. In January 2013, the venue was renamed to Sleep Train Amphitheater after the naming rights were purchased by Sleep Train, as part a five-year naming rights deal with Live Nation. On February 16, 2017, Sleep Train Amphitheatre was renamed to Mattress Firm Amphitheatre, to coincide with its partnership with Mattress Firm. On November 1, 2018, the venue was renamed to North Island Credit Union Amphitheatre, as the naming rights were purchased by Live Nation. It was in part of a ten-year name-in-title sponsorship deal with North Island Credit Union of San Diego.

Venue

The Amphitheatre features 9,468 chairback seats and 10,024 lawn seats. During the spring, summer and fall months it is used mostly for first-tier concert tours, due primarily to its capacity.

See also
 List of contemporary amphitheatres
Live Nation

References

External links
Mattress Firm Amphitheatre Web Site

Amphitheaters in California
Music venues in California
Buildings and structures in San Diego County, California
Tourist attractions in San Diego County, California
Music venues completed in 1998
Culture of Chula Vista, California
Buildings and structures in Chula Vista, California